David Griffin may refer to:

David Griffin (actor) (born 1943), English actor
David Griffin (American football) (born 1991), American football offensive lineman
David Griffin (athlete) (1905–1944), Canadian Olympic athlete
David Griffin (basketball) (born 1973), American basketball executive
David Griffin (hurler) (born 1997), Irish hurler
David Griffin (politician) (1915–2004), Australian politician
David Griffin (swimmer) (born 1967), Australian swimmer
David Ray Griffin (1939–2022), American philosopher and theologian
Dave Lee Travis (born David Patrick Griffin; 1945), English radio presenter and DJ